Chris Packer (c. 1953 – 1 September 2013) was an Australian from Perth, Western Australia who in 2004 narrowly escaped the death penalty when arrested in Bali, Indonesia for suspected arms smuggling. Police arrested Packer after finding undeclared weapons aboard his 53m cargo ship, "Lissa", registered in Avatiu.

A veteran sailor, Packer has competed in several Sydney to Hobart Yacht Races and was embarking on a round the world sailing tour at the time of his arrest.

He went into a coma, having had a heart attack on 29 April 2006 but is said to have come out of it weeks later, showing signs of recovery.

References

External links
Aussie Sailor held in Bali Jail

Australian sailors
People from Perth, Western Australia
2013 deaths
Year of birth uncertain